was a Japanese politician of the Democratic Party of Japan, a member of the House of Representatives in the Diet (national legislature). A native of Kamiiso District, Hokkaidō and high school graduate, he joined the city government of Hakodate, Hokkaidō in 1966. After having served in the city assembly of Hakodate for four terms since 1979, he was elected to the House of Representatives for the first time in 1993 as an independent with an endorsement from the Japan Socialist Party.

References

External links 
  in Japanese

1947 births
2023 deaths
Members of the House of Representatives (Japan)
Japanese municipal councilors
Politicians from Hokkaido
Democratic Party of Japan politicians
People from Hakodate
21st-century Japanese politicians